The Fallen Idol (also known as The Lost Illusion) is a 1948 British mystery thriller film directed by Carol Reed, and starring Ralph Richardson, Bobby Henrey, Michèle Morgan, and Denis O'Dea. Its plot follows the young son of a diplomat in London, who comes to suspect that his family's butler, whom he idolises, has committed a murder. It is based on the 1936 short story "The Basement Room", by Graham Greene.

The film was nominated for the Academy Award for Best Director (Carol Reed) and Best Adapted Screenplay (Graham Greene), and won the BAFTA Award for Best British Film.

Plot
Philippe is the young son of the ambassador of a French-speaking European country (strongly suggested to be France), who lives in an official residence in Belgrave Square, London.  Philippe idolizes the embassy's majordomo, Baines. The middle-aged and fastidious Baines has invented a heroic persona to keep Phillipe entertained during his father's frequent absences, telling him stories of his daring adventures in Africa and elsewhere, where he claims to have killed a man in self-defense and single-handedly vanquished lions.

In reality, Mr. Baines has never been past Ostend, is in a loveless marriage with the family's shrewish housekeeper, and is carrying on a relationship with a young embassy secretary, Julie. One afternoon, when Philippe's father departs for the weekend to retrieve his mother after eight months in hospital, Baines and Julie meet at a nearby tea shop.  Although Mrs. Baines has expressly forbidden him to go, Philippe slips down the fire escape to find Baines, discovering him deep in conversation with Julie.  She is seeking to end the liaison and go away, has already made a reservation for the Continent, but Baines is desperately trying to change her mind. Philippe is oblivious to the intimate nature of their conversation. Afterward, Baines tells Philippe that Julie is his niece and asks that he not mention the incident to Mrs. Baines. That afternoon, Philippe is chastised by Mrs. Baines for playing on a window ledge on the staircase landing. Later, she attempts to glean information about her husband from the child, suspicious he is cheating on her.  She and Baines quarrel bitterly when he seeks to tell her he wants out of their marriage.  She cuts him off, then announces she is leaving to spend the night with an aunt.  Baines assents, echoing aloud that he has been telling her she needs to get out more.

The next morning Mrs. Baines pretends to leave, case in hand, but doubles back into the house unseen.  Baines takes Philippe on a promised trip to the London Zoo. Julie joins the pair and accompanies them back home for supper, believing they will be alone there. On their arrival Philippe finds a telegram from Mrs. Baines, notifying Mr. Baines that she will return in two days. 

The three have an impromptu "picnic dinner" in a basement courtyard and afterward play a spirited game of hide-and-seek throughout the house. All the while Mrs. Baines skulks around, spying on the threesome. She later awakens Philippe, seeking to wrest Julie's whereabouts out of him.  Frightened at her unhinged appearance and manner, he yells out to alarm Baines of her presence. Enraged, she slaps the boy. The couple then argues and struggle at the top of the home's main two-story staircase, which Philippe partially witnesses. Mrs. Baines confronts her husband with having an affair with Julie. Mr. Baines tells her to go downstairs before he loses his temper, then withdraws toward the guest room. Determined to see in, Mrs. Baines instead slips onto an unprotected ledge high above the staircase to peer over a terrace in that direction.  Pressing on an open window she is leaning against, it pivots outward at the top, sweeping her feet from under her and sending her plunging to her death at the base of the stairs. Philippe does not see the fall and presumes that Baines pushed her in anger.

Philippe becomes frightened, flees the house barefoot in his pajamas, and, blocks away, darts straight into the path of a police officer patrolling his beat. He refuses to tell the truth about why he was out alone.  Meanwhile, Baines sends Julie home.  After being taken to the Chelsea police station and questioned, Philippe is returned to the embassy.  There Baines recounts the evening to police, carefully leaving Julie out of his story.  The attending doctor, originally confident the death had been accidental, recognizes Philipe and begins to query him on why he had been out alone in the night.  Suspicions begin to arise and he refuses to sign a death certificate, requesting the police physician be sent for to open an official enquiry.  He arrives and more questions are raised.  Scotland Yard is sent for, and Detective Ames appears and furthers the interrogations.  Baines lies that he and Philippe had dinner alone, but is caught out by three place settings having been used. Aware the truth is still well out of reach, Ames cuts things off and announces he will return in the morning with his superior.

Julie comes to the house the following morning. Soon after, Detective Ames and Inspector Crowe arrive, along with a specialist in fingerprints and photography. Julie attempts to leave, but upon being identified as an embassy typist is asked to stay by the police to transcribe their interviews. Crowe and Ames first interrogate Philippe alone. He denies that Mrs. Baines slapped him, or that Julie ever visited the house. Julie overhears Philippe concealing the truth, and conversing in French, sharply implores him to be honest. 

Sent off, Philippe attempts to make off with the telegram Mrs. Baines sent, but it is confiscated by the police as evidence against Baines.  Seeing he's cornered, Baines proceeds to dolefully recount to police what actually happened the night before. They continue to disbelieve his story and suggest he make a formal statement.

Told he must go to police headquarters, Baines announces he will go to his basement quarters to get his things. He is initially followed by Philippe, who tearfully questions whether his many stories are true. Baines admits they were merely fantasies and adamantly denies killing his wife. In his rooms he folds a hinged set of framed portraits of himself and Mrs. Baines and opens a bureau drawer to toss it in, only to see his pistol.  Fearing he cannot prove his innocence, thoughts of suicide dance.  

Upstairs two investigators notice a footprint in the spilt soil from a potted plant on the unprotected window ledge high above the main stairway.  It is clearly of a women's shoe, appearing to clear Baines of fatally pushing Mrs. Baines from the top of the stairs. Crow and Ames swiftly retract their accusation against him. Julie goes to the basement and informs Baines, hat in hand, that he is no longer a suspect. Philippe, having again been strongly compelled by Julie to be truthful, desperately insists on being able to explain that the footprint had actually been left in a row he'd had with Mrs. Baines two days before, but no-one will let him.  Inspector Crowe has already heard too many lies to believe he won't just be told another. 

The police leave, and Baines and Julie share a brief moment of renewed affection.  Moments later Philippe's father arrives with his mother, and shouts a greeting to him from the front door.  She too shouts, throwing her arms open to him.  Halfway up the stairs Philipe is impassive, bereft even of a look of recognition, let alone affection. Resignedly, he begins to slowly descend the steps, one at a time.

Cast

Production
Filming began on 17 September 1947, with the first location scene to be filmed being that of Philippe running across Belgrave Square in London.

Release

Critical response
At the time of its release, the film was well reviewed. The Monthly Film Bulletin called the film "outstanding." It was one of the most popular movies at the British box office in 1948. According to Kinematograph Weekly the 'biggest winner' at the box office in 1948 Britain was The Best Years of Our Lives with Spring in Park Lane being the best British film and "runners up" being It Always Rains on Sunday, My Brother Jonathan, Road to Rio, Miranda, An Ideal Husband, Naked City, The Red Shoes, Green Dolphin Street, Forever Amber, Life with Father, The Weaker Sex, Oliver Twist, The Fallen Idol and The Winslow Boy.

More than a half century later, the film has continued to attract critical attention. In 2006, William Arnold wrote "Anyone who needs to be reminded how great the movies used to be should hustle on down to the Varsity this week to catch its new-print revival of the British classic The Fallen Idol." Arnold summarized Pauline Kael's earlier review, "the plot (which is based on Greene's short story "The Basement Room") is 'just about perfect', and so are the performances, Reed's Oscar-nominated direction and the dizzying art direction and camerawork that uncannily evoke the terrifying helplessness of childhood." Ty Burr wrote "the movie's a lasting pleasure: Reed's incisive direction; Greene's easy yet weighted dialogue; the farseeing deep-focus photography of Georges Perinal; Vincent Korda's luxuriant sets. Sir Ralph, in one of his very few starring roles in a movie, gives Baines the weary sharpness of a man who's smarter than his social betters yet knows enough never to show it."

The Fallen Idol was included at number 45 on Time Out magazine's 2022 list of the "100 best British films", which polled critics and members of the film industry. It was described as "one of the finest British films about children, about the ways they can be manipulated and betrayed, their loyalties misplaced and their emotions toyed with."

Accolades

Home media
The Criterion Collection released the film on DVD on 7 November 2006. This DVD went out of print in 2010. In 2015, StudioCanal released a region B Blu-ray edition.

References

Sources

External links

 
 The Fallen Idol at BFI Screenonline
 
 
 
The Fallen Idol: Through a Child’s Eye, Darkly an essay by Geoffrey O’Brien at the Criterion Collection
Interview with child actor Robert (Bobby) Henrey later in life, interview begins at 18:05

1940s mystery drama films
1948 films
1948 drama films
British black-and-white films
British mystery drama films
Best British Film BAFTA Award winners
Film noir
Films about children
Films about infidelity
Films based on short fiction
Films based on works by Graham Greene
Films directed by Carol Reed
Films with screenplays by Graham Greene
Films set in London
Films shot in London
Films scored by William Alwyn
London Films films
1940s English-language films
1940s British films